Tobramycin/dexamethasone, sold under the brand name Tobradex, is a fixed-dose combination medication in the form of eye drops and eye ointment, marketed by Alcon. The active ingredients are tobramycin (an antibiotic) and dexamethasone (a corticosteroid). It is prescribed for the treatment of pink eye in combination with bacterial infections.

Contraindications 
It is contraindicated with herpetic and other viral eye infections. Other contraindications include fungal and mycobacterial infections because tobramycin is inactive against those, and the corticoid acts as an immunosuppressive agent, preventing the body's immune system from dealing with the infection. The drops are also contraindicated in patients with corneal lesions.

Side effects 
Similarly to other corticosteroid eye drops, side effects include hypersensitivity and, especially after long-term use, secondary eye infections, cataract (clouding of the eye lens) and increased intraocular pressure, leading to glaucoma. Consequently, the drug should not be applied longer than 24 days without further medical evaluation.

Interactions
Anticholinergic eye drops potentiate the risk of increased intraocular pressure. Systemic aminoglycoside antibiotics increase toxicity for ears, nerves and kidney.

Brand names 
Tobrason is a brand name in Jordan.

References

External links 
 

Antibiotics
Glucocorticoids
Combination drugs
Novartis brands